Jane Read may refer to:
 Jane Beetham Read, English portrait painter
 Jane Maria Read, American poet and teacher